Rhus coriaria, commonly called Sicilian sumac, tanner's sumach, or  elm-leaved sumach, is a deciduous shrub to small tree in the cashew family Anacardiaceae. It is native to southern Europe and western Asia. The dried fruits are used as a spice, particularly in combination with other spices in the mixture called za'atar.

Etymology
The word originally comes from Aramaic summāqā 'red', via Arabic, Latin, and French.

Distribution and habitat
Rhus coriaria is native to the Eastern Mediterranean, Crimea, Caucasus and northern Iran, but is now naturalized in most of the Mediterranean Basin as well as Macaronesia.

Cultivation
The plant will grow in any type of soil that is deep and well-drained.

Uses
The fruit has a sour taste; dried and crushed, it is a popular spice in the Middle East. Immature fruits and seeds are also eaten. Mature fruits were also known well before lemons to the Europeans since the times of the ancient Romans, who appreciated its sourness and used it in vinaigrettes like lemons in modern times. It is traditionally used and also clinically investigated for lipid lowering effects.

The leaves and the bark were traditionally used in leather tanning and contain tannic acid.

Dyes of various colours, red, yellow, black, and brown, can be made from different parts of the plant.

Oil extracted from the seeds can be used to make candles. It has been reported that the plant has significant antioxidant, antimicrobial, anticancer and DNA protective activity.

Images

References

coriaria
Spices
Flora of Europe
Flora of Western Asia
Flora of Central Asia
Plants described in 1753
Taxa named by Carl Linnaeus